City of Walls is the fourth album by Scottish musician Paul Mounsey released in 2003 (see 2003 in music).

Track listing 

 "City of Walls"
 "Since..."
 "Dunfermline"
 "Heaven's Full"
 "Work Song"
 "Billy's Birl"
 "The Bridge"
 "Gad Ionndrainn"
 "A Ferro E Fogo"
 "Nothing to Lose"
 "A Child"
 "Taking Back the Land"
 "Nineteen Trees"
 "Annie"

References

2003 albums
Paul Mounsey albums